Melange comes from the French meaning of a "mixture" or "medley". It may also refer to:

Melange (fictional drug) in Frank Herbert's Dune series novels
Mélange (rocket fuel component)
Mélange, a type of rock with block-in-matrix structure containing diverse blocks of rocks
Melange (yarn) yarns made with mixed fibers dyed before yarn spinning
Wiener Melange ("Viennese blend") a specialty coffee, similar to a cappuccino